Giacomo Alfaridio (died 1511) was a Roman Catholic prelate who served as Bishop of Città Ducale (1508–1511).

Biography
On 16 October 1508, Giacomo Alfaridio was appointed during the papacy of Pope Julius II as Bishop of Città Ducale.
He served as Bishop of Città Ducale until his death in 1511.

References

External links and additional sources
 (for Chronology of Bishops) 
 (for Chronology of Bishops) 

16th-century Italian Roman Catholic bishops
Bishops appointed by Pope Julius II
1511 deaths